The president of Northern Cyprus is the head of state of the Turkish Republic of Northern Cyprus. Rauf Denktaş was the first and founding president of Northern Cyprus, and retired in 2005. His position was taken over by Mehmet Ali Talat, followed by Derviş Eroğlu, then Mustafa Akıncı, and the current president, Ersin Tatar.

The president is elected every five years. Presidential elections are held in two rounds if no candidate gains more than 50% of the votes in the first round. It is necessary that the president is originated from the island of Cyprus. The president must have lived in the country for five years, received secondary education and be over 30 years old.

The presidency is not a ceremonial position in the semi-presidential political system of Northern Cyprus. The president reserves the right to dismiss the Assembly of the Republic in case a government cannot be formed within sixty days or three successive governments receive votes of no confidence. They also can preside over the Council of Ministers if they wish to do so, approve the appointments of the judges and president of the Supreme Court and have the right to send laws approved by the Assembly of the Republic to the Supreme Court. The president has also traditionally been the chief negotiator for the resolution of the Cyprus dispute and been responsible for the foreign relations of Northern Cyprus.

The president is represented by the speaker of the Assembly of the Republic when the president is abroad.

The most recent presidential election was held on 11 October 2020. Ersin Tatar is the current president.

List

Timeline

Latest election

See also
 Politics of Northern Cyprus
 Prime Minister of Northern Cyprus

References

External links
 Official website

Politics of Northern Cyprus
Presidents of Northern Cyprus